William Donaldson (20 January 1920 – 1977) was a Scottish professional footballer who played in the Football League for Bradford Park Avenue and Mansfield Town.

References

1920s births
1977 deaths
Scottish footballers
Association football wingers
English Football League players
Leith Athletic F.C. players
Mansfield Town F.C. players
Bradford (Park Avenue) A.F.C. players
Grantham Town F.C. players